Clark is an English-language surname.

Clark may also refer to:

Places

United States
 Clark, Colorado
 Clark, Missouri
 Clark, Nevada
 Clark, New Jersey
 Clark, Pennsylvania
 Clark, South Dakota
 Clark, Texas, former name of DISH, Texas
 Clark, Washington
 Clark, West Virginia
 Clark, Wisconsin
 Clark County (disambiguation)
 Clark Creek (disambiguation)
 Clark Point, point in eastern Virginia by the Chesapeake Bay
 Clark Township (disambiguation)

Elsewhere
 Clark Freeport and Special Economic Zone, Philippines
 Clark Global City, Clark Freeport Zone
 New Clark City, Clark Special Economic Zone
 Clark (volcano), a submarine volcano north of New Zealand
 Clark Mountains, Antarctica

Extra-terrestrial
 Clark (lunar crater), a crater on the moon
 Clark (Martian crater), a crater on Mars

Education
 Clark Atlanta University, in Atlanta, Georgia, USA
 Clark College, a community college in Vancouver, Washington, USA
 Clark High School (disambiguation)
 Clark University, in Worcester, Massachusetts, USA

Other uses
 Clark (album), by English musician Chris Clark 
 Clark (given name), people with the given name
 Clark (mascot), the mascot of the Chicago Cubs baseball team
 Clark (TV series), a 2022 Swedish TV series
 Clark Art Institute or The Clark
 Clark Bar, a candy bar
 Clark Boat Company, a former U.S. boat building company
 Clark Bridge, a bridge over the Mississippi River between Missouri and Illinois
 Clark Brands, a 20th-century gas station chain
 Clark Construction, an engineering and construction firm
 Clark Equipment Company, a former maker of construction equipment
 Clark International Airport, Pampanga, Philippines
 Clark Material Handling Company, stylised as CLARK
 The Clark, an Alaskan gold dredge on Bering Sea Gold reality TV show
 "Clark", a song from the album Minecraft – Volume Alpha by C418

See also
 
 Clarke
 Clark's rule
 Clarks (disambiguation)
 Clarksburg (disambiguation)
 Clarkson (disambiguation)
 Clarkston (disambiguation)
 Clarksville (disambiguation)
 Clerk (disambiguation) 
 Clerke (disambiguation)
 Kimberly-Clark, a U.S. producer of paper-based consumer products